The Newark Bears were an American Minor League Baseball team that played in the top-level International League from 1917 through the 1949 season, with the exception of the 1920 campaign and part of 1925. The Bears succeeded the Newark Indians, originally the Sailors, who played in the same circuit (known as the Eastern League prior to 1912) from 1902.  During the Bears' lifetime, the International League was graded one step below the Major League Baseball level, Class AA through 1945 and Triple-A starting in 1946. The franchise played its home games at Ruppert Stadium in what is now known as the Ironbound section of Newark, New Jersey; the stadium was demolished in 1967. The 1932, 1937, 1938, and 1941 Bears were recognized as being among the 100 greatest minor league teams of all time.

Players in the Bears' early years who had Major League careers include Eddie Rommel, who pitched for the International League Newark Bears in 1918 and 1919. Harry Baldwin played three seasons for the Newark Bears (1921–1923) before playing for the New York Giants.  Fred Brainard, who also played for the New York Giants 1914–1916, later played for the Newark Bears between 1922–1924 and was the Bears' player-manager in 1923 and 1924. Other former Major League players who managed the Newark Bears include Hall of Fame members Walter Johnson in 1928 and player-manager Tris Speaker in 1929–1930.

Newark was a hotbed of minor league baseball from the time of the formation of the Sailors, and the addition of the Newark Eagles of the Negro National Leagues in 1936. A Federal League team, the Newark Peppers, played in 1915. The Bears, however, temporarily relocated twice, in 1920 as the Akron Buckeyes and from May 16 through September 27, 1925 as the Providence Grays.

in 1931, Jacob Ruppert, owner of the New York Yankees, bought the Bears and made them the top club in the Yankees' growing farm system; they would remain one of the Bombers' top-level minor-league clubs for the rest of their existence. In 1937, the Bears featured one of the most potent lineups in baseball, including Charlie Keller, Joe Gordon, Spud Chandler and George McQuinn, among others. They won the pennant by 25½ games to become known as one of the greatest minor league teams of all time. Their legacy was ensured when, after trailing 3 games to 0, they won the last four games against the Columbus Red Birds of the American Association to capture the Junior World Series.

Following the 1949 season, the Bears moved to Springfield, Massachusetts. Their departure, and the departure of the Eagles a year before, left Newark without professional baseball for nearly 50 years, until the formation of the Atlantic League Bears (see above).

One of the Bears' players, veteran pitcher George Earl Toolson, was reassigned by the Yankees to the AA Binghamton Triplets for the 1950 season. He refused to report and sued, challenging baseball's reserve clause in Toolson v. New York Yankees, which went all the way to the U.S. Supreme Court. The justices upheld the clause and baseball's antitrust exemption, 7–2.

Season-by-season records

Post-season results
1932: Defeated Minneapolis Millers (American Association), 4 games to 2, in Junior World Series
1933: Lost to Rochester Red Wings, 3 games to 1, in opening round
1934: Lost to Toronto Maple Leafs, 4 games to 3, in opening round
1935: Lost to Syracuse Chiefs, 4 games to 0, in opening round
1936: Lost to Buffalo Bisons, 4 games to 1, in opening round
1937: Defeated Syracuse Chiefs, 4 games to 0; defeated Baltimore Orioles, 4 games to 0, for league championship; defeated Columbus Red Birds, 4 games to 3, in Junior World Series
1938: Defeated Rochester Red Wings, 4 games to 3; defeated Buffalo Bisons, 4 games to 1, for league championship; lost to Kansas City Blues, 4 games to 3, in Junior World Series
1939: Defeated Jersey City Giants, 4 games to 2; lost to Rochester Red Wings, 4 games to 3, in championship round
1940: Defeated Jersey City Giants, 4 games to 0; defeated Baltimore Orioles, 4 games to 3, for league championship; defeated Louisville Colonels, 4 games to 2, in Junior World Series
1941: Defeated Rochester Red Wings, 4 games to 1; lost to Montreal Royals, 4 games to 3, in championship round
1942: Lost to Jersey City Giants, 4 games to 2, in opening round
1943: Lost to Syracuse Chiefs, 4 games to 2, in opening round
1944: Defeated Toronto Maple Leafs, 4 games to 0; lost to Baltimore Orioles, 4 games to 3, in championship round
1945: Defeated Toronto Maple Leafs, 4 games to 2; defeated Montreal Royals, 4 games to 3, for league championship; lost to Louisville Colonels, 4 games to 2, in Junior World Series
1946: Lost to Montréal Royals, 4 games to 2, in opening round
1948: Lost to Syracuse Chiefs, 4 games to 3, in opening round

Titles
The Bears won the Governors' Cup, the championship of the IL, 4 times, and played in the championship series 7 times.
1937 – Defeated Baltimore
1938 – Defeated Buffalo
1939 – Lost to Rochester
1940 – Defeated Baltimore
1941 – Lost to Montreal
1944 – Lost to Baltimore
1945 – Defeated Montreal

Other historical Newark teams

Other teams hailing from Newark include:
 Newark Domestics, played in the Eastern League from 1884 to 1885.
 Newark Little Giants, played in the Eastern League in 1886, and the International League in 1887.
 Newark, played in the Central League in 1888, and the Atlantic Association from 1889 to 1890.
 Newark Colts, played in the Atlantic League from 1896 to 1900.
 Newark, played in the 1908 Pennsylvania-New Jersey League
 Newark Indians, played in the Eastern League from 1902 to 1911, and the International League from 1912 to the middle of the 1915 season. They were the International League champions in 1913.
 Newark Stars, played in the Eastern Colored League in 1926.
 Newark Browns, played in the East-West League in 1932.
 Newark Dodgers, played in the Negro National League from 1934 to 1935.
 Newark Peppers, played in the Federal League in 1915.
 Newark Bears, played in the New York–Penn League in 1950 to 1952.

References

Defunct International League teams
Sports in Newark, New Jersey
Professional baseball teams in New Jersey
New York Yankees minor league affiliates
1919 establishments in New Jersey
1949 disestablishments in New Jersey
Defunct baseball teams in New Jersey
Sports clubs disestablished in 1949
Baseball teams established in 1919